Lip tricks in skateboarding are performed on half-pipes, quarterpipes and mini ramps. They are tricks that require different varieties of balance on the "lip" of the ramp. The first lip trick done was by Jay Adams.

Inverts/Handplants

Skateboarding tricks